Black Beach is a 2020 Spanish thriller drama film directed by Esteban Crespo which stars Raúl Arévalo alongside Candela Peña.

Plot 
Featuring the backdrop of a large-scale political and corporate corruption scheme, Carlos, an unscrupulous executive (and former development cooperator), is sent as a mediator to the kidnapping of an oil company engineer in an African country where he worked in the past, bringing his personal and business interests to collide.

Cast

Production 
The screenplay was penned by Esteban Crespo and David Moreno. The film is a Pris&Batty Films, Nephilim and BlackBeach AIE production, with the participation of RTVE and Netflix, reportedly boasting a budget of around €7 million. Shooting locations included Ghana, the Canary Islands, Brussels, Toledo, and Madrid.

Release 
The film premiered at the 23rd Málaga Film Festival's main competition on 23 August 2020. Distributed by eOne Films Spain, the film was theatrically released in Spain on 25 September 2020.

Reception 
Raquel Hernández Luján of HobbyConsolas gave the "ambitious and well structured" film 70 out of 100 points ("good"), highlighting an "enviable" production design while noting that more excitement is missing, with the more compelling story being the subplot pertaining Peña's supporting character.

Quim Casas of El Periódico de Catalunya gave Black Beach 2 out of 5 stars, writing that it "turns out to be an unbalanced film", remaining in no man's land, "solvent at times. Insufficient at other times", with the "things that happen and are said in the African country seeming to come straight out of a colonial comic book".

Sergio F. Pinilla of Cinemanía rated the film 4½ out of 5 stars, concluding as a veredict that "Arevalo's odyssey is entertaining, moving and thought-provoking".

Marta Medina of El Confidencial deemed the "confusing" film to feature "many possibilities and little sincerity", also considering that "there is something too contrived in both the narration and the mise-en-scène, which prevents the story from flowing naturally".

Accolades 

|-
| rowspan = "6" align = "center" | 2021 || rowspan = "6" | 35th Goya Awards || Best Production Supervision || Carmen Martínez Muñoz ||  || rowspan = "6" | 
|-
| Best Cinematography || Ángel Amorós || 
|-
| Best Editing || Fernando Franco, Miguel Doblado || 
|-
| Best Art Direction || Montse Sanz || 
|-
| Best Sound || Coque Lahera, Nacho Royo-Villanova, Sergio Testón || 
|-
| Best Special Effects || Raúl Romanillos, Jean-Louis Billard || 
|}

See also 
 List of Spanish films of 2020

References 

Films set in Africa
Spanish thriller drama films
2020 thriller drama films
Films shot in Ghana
Films shot in the Canary Islands
Films shot in the province of Toledo
Films shot in Madrid
Films shot in Brussels
2020s Spanish-language films
2020s Spanish films